= Gujaran Na Mohra =

- Union council
- Location within Pakistan
- Coordinates: 33°26′46″N 73°24′55″E
- Country: Pakistan
- Province: (Islamabad Capital Territory) Islamabad C.T
- Elevation: 572 m (1,877 ft)

Population
  - Total: 66,618
- Time zone: UTC+5 (PST)

Gujaran Na Mohra is a union council in the Islamabad Capital Territory of Pakistan. It is located at 33°26'46" N 73°24'55" E, with an altitude of 572 metres (1879 feet).
